Turning Point: 9/11 and the War on Terror is a 2021 American five-part docuseries created for Netflix and directed by Brian Knappenberger. It was produced by Luminant Media. The series documents the terrorist attacks that occurred on September 11, 2001 in New York City's Lower Manhattan, as well as the events that took place both in Afghanistan and the United States, which led to the attacks. It was released on September 1, 2021.

Episodes

Reception 
On the review aggregation website Rotten Tomatoes gave the series an approval rating 83%  of based on reviews from 6 critics. On Metacritic it has a score of 74 out of 100 based on reviews from 6 critics, indicating "generally unfavorable reviews".  

James M. Lindsay and Anna Shortridge place this on a list of seven documentaries recommendations on 9/11 for the Council on Foreign Relations. Azad Essa criticsed the docuseries in the Middle East Eye for its "orientalist" view of Muslims.

References

External links 

2021 American television series debuts
2020s American crime television series
2020s American television miniseries
Documentary films about the September 11 attacks
English-language Netflix original programming
Netflix original documentary television series
Television series set in 2001
Documentary films about terrorism